The Forward Party of Utah is the Utah affiliate of the Forward Party. The party has yet to achieve official party status, however, as of February 2023 had begun collecting signatures for a petition to acquire official party status with the approval of the Lieutenant Governor's office.

The party, commonly referred to simply as "FWD," began organization in mid-2022, following a merger with the Utah-based Renew America Movement and collaboration with the unsuccessful campaign of Evan McMullin in the 2022 United States Senate election in Utah. Formally established on February 11th of 2023, the party held its first events in September of 2022, after which it endorsed a slate of candidates in the 2022 United States elections largely forwarded by the United Utah Party, as well as independent candidate Evan McMullin, founder of the Renew America Movement, a predecessor to the party.

Electoral performance

References

External links 
 https://www.forwardparty.com/utah

Political parties in Utah